BIIB033 (also known as Anti-LINGO-1) is a monoclonal antibody targeting LINGO1. As of 2015 it was being developed by Biogen as a treatment for diseases such as multiple sclerosis and optic neuritis.

See also 
 Ocrelizumab

References 

Monoclonal antibodies
Experimental drugs